In mathematics, the Prouhet–Thue–Morse constant, named for Eugène Prouhet, Axel Thue, and Marston Morse, is the number—denoted by —whose binary expansion 0.01101001100101101001011001101001... is given by the Thue–Morse sequence.  That is,

where  is the  element of the Prouhet–Thue–Morse sequence.

Other representations

The Prouhet–Thue–Morse constant can also be expressed, without using  , as an infinite product,

This formula is obtained by substituting x = 1/2 into generating series for 

The continued fraction expansion of the constant is [0; 2, 2, 2, 1, 4, 3, 5, 2, 1, 4, 2, 1, 5, 44, 1, 4, 1, 2, 4, 1, …] 

Yann Bugeaud and Martine Queffélec showed that infinitely many partial quotients of this continued fraction are 4 or 5, and infinitely many partial quotients are greater than or equal to 50.

Transcendence

The Prouhet–Thue–Morse constant was shown to be transcendental by Kurt Mahler in 1929.

He also showed that the number

is also transcendental for any algebraic number α, where 0 < |α| < 1.

Yann Bugaeud proved that the Prouhet–Thue–Morse constant has an irrationality measure of 2.

Appearances

The Prouhet–Thue–Morse constant appears in probability. If a language L over {0, 1} is chosen at random, by flipping a fair coin to decide whether each word w is in L, the probability that it contains at least one word for each possible length is

See also
 Euler-Mascheroni constant
 Fibonacci word
 Golay–Rudin–Shapiro sequence
 Komornik–Loreti constant

Notes

References
.

External links 
 
 The ubiquitous Prouhet-Thue-Morse sequence, John-Paull Allouche and Jeffrey Shallit, (undated, 2004 or earlier) provides many applications and some history
 PlanetMath entry

Mathematical constants
Number theory
Real transcendental numbers